Cyanea is a genus of flowering plants in the family Campanulaceae. The name Cyanea in Hawaiian is hāhā. These Hawaiian lobelioids are endemic to Hawaii with over 90% of Cyanea species are found only on one island in the Hawaiian chain. They grow in moist and wet forest habitat and are largely pollinated by birds such as the Hawaiian honeycreepers, and the seeds are dispersed by birds that take the fruits. Most Cyanea are trees with few branches or none. The inflorescence is a raceme of 4 to 45 flowers which grows from the leaf axils. The fruit is a fleshy berry. There have been several theories regarding the evolution of large prickles on plants endemic to islands that lack any mammalian or reptilian herbivores. One such theory suggests that the prickles are a defense against herbivory by the moa-nalo, a few taxa of flightless ducks that went extinct on the islands within the last 1600 years.

Species 

There are about 78 species in the genus. Species include:
 Cyanea aculeatiflora – Haleakala cyanea
 Cyanea acuminata – Honolulu cyanea
 Cyanea angustifolia – hāhā, aku, 
 Cyanea arborea – palmtree cyanea
 Cyanea asarifolia – gingerleaf cyanea
 Cyanea aspleniifolia – spleenwort cyanea
 Cyanea calycina – Waianae Range rollandia, Oahu cyanea
 Cyanea comata – Maui cyanea
 Cyanea copelandii – treetrunk cyanea   
 Cyanea coriacea – leatherleaf cyanea   
 Cyanea crispa – Koolau Range rollandia   
 Cyanea cylindrocalyx – Splitleaf cyanea
 Cyanea dolichopoda – long-foot cyanea
 Cyanea dunbariae – ravine cyanea
 Cyanea duvalliorum
 Cyanea eleeleensis – eleele cyanea
 Cyanea elliptica – ellipticleaf cyanea
 Cyanea fissa – Kauai cyanea   
 Cyanea floribunda – Degener's cyanea
 Cyanea giffardii – Kilauea Mauna cyanea 
 Cyanea gibsonii
 Cyanea glabra – smooth cyanea
 Cyanea grimesiana – splitleaf cyanea
 Cyanea habenata – stream-bed cyanea
 Cyanea hamatiflora – wetforest cyanea
 Cyanea hardyi – Oahu cyanea
 Cyanea heluensis
 Cyanea hirtella – rustyleaf cyanea
 Cyanea horrida – prickly cyanea
 Cyanea humboldtiana – Oahu rollandia
 Cyanea kahiliensis – spoonleaf cyanea
 Cyanea kauaulaensis
 Cyanea kolekoleensis – kolekole cyanea
 Cyanea konahuanuiensis – Hāhā miliohu
 Cyanea koolauensis – Palolo Valley rollandia
 Cyanea kuhihewa – Limahuli Valley cyanea
 Cyanea kunthiana – Kunth's cyanea 
 Cyanea lanceolata – lanceleaf cyanea 
 Cyanea leptostegia – giant kokee cyanea
 Cyanea linearifolia – linearleaf cyanea
 Cyanea lobata – Waihee Valley cyanea
 Cyanea longiflora – ridge rollandia
 Cyanea longissima – streambank cyanea
 Cyanea macrostegia – purple cyanea
 Cyanea magnicalyx
 Cyanea mannii – Mann's cyanea
 Cyanea maritae
 Cyanea marksii – Marks' cyanea
 Cyanea mauiensis – Maui cyanea
 Cyanea mceldowneyi – McEldowney's cyanea
 Cyanea membranacea – papery cyanea
 Cyanea minutiflora 
 Cyanea munroi – Munro's cyanea
 Cyanea obtusa – bluntlobe cyanea
 Cyanea parvifolia – Waioli Valley rollandia   
 Cyanea pilosa – hairy cyanea 
 Cyanea pinnatifida – sharktail cyanea
 Cyanea platyphylla – puna cyanea
 Cyanea pohaku – pohaku cyanea
 Cyanea procera – Molokai cyanea
 Cyanea profuga – Mapulehu Valley cyanea
 Cyanea pseudofauriei – hāhā
 Cyanea purpurellifolia – Panaluu Mountain rollandia 
 Cyanea pycnocarpa – manyfruit cyanea   
 Cyanea quercifolia – oakleaf cyanea 
 Cyanea recta – Kealia cyanea
 Cyanea remyi – Remy's cyanea
 Cyanea rivularis – plateau cyanea   
 Cyanea salicina – willow cyanea   
 Cyanea scabra – harsh cyanea   
 Cyanea sessilifolia – sessileleaf cyanea 
 Cyanea shipmanii – Shipman's cyanea
 Cyanea solanacea – popolo
 Cyanea solenocalyx – pua kala, molokai
 Cyanea spathulata – spoonleaf cyanea 
 Cyanea st.-johnii – St. John's rollandia
 Cyanea stictophylla – Kaiholena cyanea
 Cyanea superba – Mt. Kaala cyanea
 Cyanea tritomantha – aku aku, aku
 Cyanea truncata – Punaluu cyanea
 Cyanea undulata – leechleaf cyanea

References

 
Endemic flora of Hawaii
Campanulaceae genera